The Birthday Present is a 1957 British drama film directed by Pat Jackson. The film also featured Thorley Walters and Ian Bannen in small roles.

Pat Jackson considered it one of his favourite films, calling it "an honest piece of filmmaking, with a lovely performance from Sylvia Syms. It was a very interesting and well written script."

Plot
Simon Scott, a top toy salesman, returns from a business trip to Germany with a watch hidden inside a toy intended as a birthday present for his wife (Sylvia Syms). He is caught by customs, arrested, and the following day sentenced to three months’ imprisonment for smuggling. He is taken to Wormwood Scrubs. He is not the normal type of prisoner, wearing a three-piece  suit with a silk tie. He then becomes prisoner 1692 and is taken to a spartan cell.

The guards are surly but other prisoners are generally friendly.

As he pleads guilty there is no right of appeal (other than against the length of sentence). He tells his wife an appeal is too costly and will take too long.

His wife tells his employer’s managing director, Colonel Wilson, that, contrary to earlier reports, Simon has not been sick but is serving a prison sentence. Wilson tries to keep the information to himself but colleagues eventually find out. Privately he decides he would allow Simon to return to work following his release.

However, when Simon does next meet him, the MD regretfully  tells him that a board meeting has decided that he cannot continue to work for them (as marketing manager of their toy factory). An employment agency warns Scott that many professional people with a criminal record are forced back into crime due to the inability to find employment. His wife then takes a job (as a photographic model) in order to support them. Simon eventually has an offer of a similar job at another factory (without divulging his crime at the interview) but after saying he has the job they call his old employer for a reference, are told the truth and decide to withdraw the offer.

However, Wilson, who remains convinced he took the right decision at his earlier meeting with Simon, forcefully debates the issue with the directors and points out if he had been fined rather than going to prison they would have a different attitude.

The film ends with Simon receiving a letter from Wilson saying he can return after all.

The film explores several complex issues: problems in finding legal representation, the  lack of competence and insensitivity of some solicitors, the day-to-day reality of prison life, as well as the financial and other practical difficulties in submitting an appeal against a relatively short sentence. Scott decides to drop the appeal and serve his time.

Cast

 Tony Britton as Simon Scott 
 Sylvia Syms as Jean Scott, his wife 
 Jack Watling as Bill Thompson 
 Walter Fitzgerald as Sir John Dell 
 Geoffrey Keen as Colonel Wilson, Scott's boss 
 Howard Marion-Crawford as George Bates 
 John Welsh as Chief Customs officer
 Lockwood West as Mr. Barraclough  
 Harry Fowler as Charlie 
 Frederick Piper as Careers Officer  
 Cyril Luckham as Magistrate  
 Thorley Walters as Photographer  
 Ernest Clark as Barrister
James Raglan as Prison Governor	
Anthony Sagar as 1st Reception Officer	
Barry Keegan as Junior Reception Officer	
Victor Brooks as 2nd Reception Officer	
Malcolm Keen as Bristow	
Laidman Brown as Dawson	
Arnold Bell as Green	
Michael Warre as Jerry	
Ralph Michael as Crowther	
Gay Cameron as Ruth	
Frances Rowe as Secretary	
Jeremy Burnham as Dudley
Howard Lang as Cell Block Officer

Glyn Houston as Police Officer in Court

Production
The film was the first production from Jack Whittingham Productions Ltd, a new company formed by Jack Whittingham and Pat Jackson. The film was shot at Shepperton Studios and released by British Lion.

Reception
Variety called it "smooth but uninspired".

The Radio Times dismissed the film as a "doleful, overlong slice of surburban life", while Allmovie called it "a bitter half-hour anecdote stretched to 100 minutes... Intended as a slice of raw realism, Birthday Present plays more like a cautionary social studies film." TV Guide said, "All-around fine technical efforts add a sense of authenticity," and the British Film Institute's Monthly Film Bulletin described the film as being "creditable" but "novelettish, and the problem handled and solved at a purely sentimental level". Filmink called it "a hidden gem".

Pat Jackson said "it got wonderful, wonderful notices...didn't do
commercially well because Asian 'flu if you remember, hit London very badly, it was all sort of at that time."

References

External links
 

1957 films
British drama films
British Lion Films films
1957 drama films
Films directed by Pat Jackson
Films scored by Clifton Parker
Films with screenplays by Jack Whittingham
1950s English-language films
1950s British films